Louise Smith (July 31, 1916, in Barnesville, Georgia – April 15, 2006) was tied for the second woman to race in NASCAR at the top level. She was known as "the first lady of racing."

She went as a spectator to her first NASCAR race at the Daytona Beach Road Course in 1949. She could not stand watching the races, so she entered her family's shiny new Ford coupe in the race and rolled it. Her hometown Greenville, South Carolina paper featured photos of the wreck, and the town knew about it before she got home. The race was the first race to feature three female drivers (Ethel Mobley and Sara Christian). The trio also competed later that season at the Langley Speedway.

She raced from 1949 to 1956. She won 38 races in her career in numerous formats: late models, modifieds (28 victories), midgets, and sportsman.

Car owner
She returned in 1971 as a car owner for numerous drivers. She sponsored Ronnie Thomas' Rookie of the Year attempt in 1978.

Award
She became the first woman inducted into the International Motorsports Hall of Fame in 1999.

Motorsports career results

NASCAR
(key) (Bold – Pole position awarded by qualifying time. Italics – Pole position earned by points standings or practice time. * – Most laps led.)

Grand National Series

Bibliography
 Fearless: The Story of Racing Legend Louise Smith (Dutton Books for Children) by Barb Rosenstock, 2010.

References

External links
nascar.com Biography
NASCAR driver's statistics at racing-reference.info
NASCAR owner's statistics at racing-reference.info
Biography at the International Motorsports Hall of Fame
Biography
Laidback Racing site
Obituary
Louise Smith Biography

1916 births
2006 deaths
Deaths from cancer
American female racing drivers
NASCAR drivers
International Motorsports Hall of Fame inductees
Sportspeople from Greenville, South Carolina
Racing drivers from South Carolina
People from Barnesville, Georgia
Sportspeople from the Atlanta metropolitan area
20th-century American women
20th-century American people
21st-century American women